Goodwyn is an English surname. Notable people with the surname include:

Albert Taylor Goodwyn (1842–1931), U.S. Representative from Alabama
Alfred Goodwyn (1850–1874), English Royal Engineer who represented his regiment at football
Charles Wyndham Goodwyn, British philatelist, Keeper of the Royal Philatelic Collection 1995–2003
Goodwyn Barmby (1820–1881), British Victorian utopian socialist
Myles Goodwyn (born 1948), Canadian record producer, guitarist, lead vocalist, main songwriter and founding member of April Wine
Peterson Goodwyn (1745–1818), soldier, politician and planter from Virginia
S. Bernard Goodwyn, Justice on the Supreme Court of Virginia

See also
Goodwyns, a housing estate in Dorking, England

English-language surnames